Jasminum elongatum, is a species of flowering plant in the family Oleaceae.

This scrambling evergreen shrub can be grown in the sun or semi-shade. It has pinnate leaves and masses of white, strongly-scented, star-shaped flowers. This is one of native species of jasmine that naturally occur in East Asia. Vine stem diameters to 4 cm recorded. Usually grows as a vine but can flower and fruit as a shrub.

References

elongatum